Russell Hubbard Nevins (January 10, 1785 – November 27, 1854) was an American banker and the president of the New York Stock Exchange.

Early life
Nevins was born on January 10, 1785, in Norwich, Connecticut. He was a son of David Nevins of Norwich and the former Mary Hubbard of Lyme, Connecticut. Among his siblings was brothers Henry and Rufus Nevins and younger sister, Elizabeth Nevis, was married to fellow banker Elihu Townsend.

Career
He was a founding partner, with his brother-in-law Elihu Townsend, of the Wall Street brokerage firm Nevins, Townsend & Co. From 1830 to 1831, he served as the fifth president of the New York Stock Exchange.

Nevins also invested in real estate, developing the Boerum Hill neighborhood of Brooklyn with Charles Hoyt.

Personal life

Nevins died unmarried in New York City on November 27, 1854, and was originally interred at New York Marble Cemetery.  He was later re-interred at Green-Wood Cemetery in Brooklyn.

Honors and legacy
There is a street named for Russell H. Nevins that crosses the Brooklyn neighborhood of Boerum Hill, and the IRT Eastern Parkway Line of the New York City Subway ( trains) serve Nevins Street station.

References

External links

1785 births
1854 deaths
Presidents of the New York Stock Exchange
American bankers
Burials at Green-Wood Cemetery
19th-century American businesspeople
Burials at New York Marble Cemetery